The Lee County Courthouse is a Texas State Antiquities Landmark, is a Recorded Texas Historic Landmark, and is listed on the National Register of Historic Places.

The first Lee County Courthouse was built in 1878 in Second Empire style, but was destroyed by fire in 1897.  The new courthouse, built in 1898, was designed by architect J. Riely Gordon in Richardsonian Romanesque style.

See also

National Register of Historic Places listings in Lee County, Texas
Recorded Texas Historic Landmarks in Lee County
List of county courthouses in Texas

References

External links

Courthouses in Texas
Courthouses on the National Register of Historic Places in Texas
National Register of Historic Places in Lee County, Texas
Romanesque Revival architecture in Texas
Government buildings completed in 1898